Matthew A. Reynolds (born 1964) served as the United States' Assistant Secretary of State for Legislative Affairs from  to , serving under the 66th Secretary of State Condoleezza Rice. Prior to this appointment he served as the bureau's Principal Deputy Assistant Secretary and intermittently as Acting Assistant Secretary beginning in March 2005.

Mr. Reynolds served as the Deputy Assistant Secretary for Senate Affairs from September 2004 to March 2005. He joined the State Department in May 2003 as the Director of House Affairs. In this position, he received the Department's Superior Honor Award for Service. Prior to coming to the State Department, Mr. Reynolds spent 17 years in numerous senior positions in both the U.S. House of Representatives and the U.S. Senate. He served as Staff Director of the powerful House Rules Committee, guiding legislation on the House Floor, and as professional staff on the House International Relations Committee and the Senate Foreign Relations Committee.

In addition to congressional committee assignments, Mr. Reynolds has also served as Chief of Staff to U.S. Representative Jay Kim (R-CA) and Legislative Director to U.S. Representative Robert J. Lagomarsino (R-CA). He began his congressional career with Congressman Lagomarsino in 1986.

After leaving the Department of State, Reynolds assumed leadership of the newly established Washington, DC Representative Office of the United Nations Relief and Works Agency for Palestine Refugees in the Near East.

Mr. Reynolds is a native of Dover, Massachusetts and grew up in Kanpur, India and Beirut, Lebanon. He graduated from Tabor Academy in Marion, Massachusetts and received his B.S.F.S. degree and the Dean's Citation from the School of Foreign Service, Georgetown University.

References

State Department
Contact Us-UNRWA

1964 births
Living people
Walsh School of Foreign Service alumni
United States Assistant Secretaries of State
People from Dover, Massachusetts
Tabor Academy (Massachusetts) alumni